Juriya is a village in the Lohardaga district of Jharkhand state of India. According to the 2011 census, the village had a population of 5398.

See also 
 Lohardaga district

References 

Villages in Lohardaga district